Samuel Wesley the Younger (10 February 1690 or 1691 – 6 November 1739) was a poet, teacher and an Anglican cleric. He was the eldest of the Wesley brothers—with younger brothers John and Charles—but did not play a notable role in the nascent Methodist movement.

Birth
Wesley was the eldest son of the cleric and poet Samuel Wesley and of Susanna Annesley Wesley.  He was the brother of John Wesley and Charles Wesley. He was born in Spitalfields, London in either 1690 or 1691.  He said he was 18 years old in 1711 and he wrote a letter in which he said he was born in 1690.  His tombstone said he died in his 49th year, which would put his birth in 1691.

Education and career
Wesley was educated at Westminster School before entering Christ Church, Oxford in 1711 where he received a B.A. degree in 1715 and a M.A. in  1718.  He was ordained and became head usher at Westminster School for 20 years (from 1713 to 1733).  After that he was master of Blundell's School, Tiverton, Devon, where he died after a short illness on 6 November 1739. He is buried in the Tiverton churchyard.

Marriage
Wesley married Ursula Berry (died c1742), daughter of the Reverend John Berry, vicar of Walton, Norfolk.  They had six children, four of whom died in infancy.  They were survived by two children: a daughter and a son.

Religion
A high church Tory, Wesley was a friend of Bishop Francis Atterbury. He was never a Methodist and yet five hymns of several composed by him are in the Wesleyan Hymn Book of the present day.

Text records
1723 The Battle of the Sexes. A Poem.
1726 Pastoral.
1726 The Iliad in a Nutshell: or, Homer's Battle of the Frogs and Mice.
1736 The Descriptive: a Miltonick. After the Manner of the Moderns.
1736 ca. Wroote: a Heroic Poem. Humbly inscribed to Miss Mehetabel Wesley.

Publications
Neck or nothing, a consolatory letter from Mr Dunton to Mr Curll. 1716.
The battle of the sexes: a poem. 1723.
A new ballad. 1723.
The story of the three children. 1724.
The pig and the mastiff: two tales. 1725.
The Iliad in a nutshell: or Homer's Battle of the frogs and mice. 1726.
To the memory of the right reverend father in God, Francis Gastrell. 1726.
The prisons open'd: a poem. 1729. Online at the British Library
Verses on the death of Mrs Morice. 1730.
The cobbler, a tale. 173?
The parish priest: a poem upon a clergyman lately deceas'd. 1732.
The Christian poet ... or poems by Mr. Wesley. 1735.
Four tales after the manner of the ingenious Matt Prior. 1735?
Poems on several occasions. 1736, 1743.
Tales, instructive and entertaining. 1808.
Poems on several occasions ... including many pieces never before published, ed. John Nichols

References

Sources
Virginia Tech, Center for Applied Technologies in the Humanities, Biography of Rev. Samuel Wesley the Younger, Extracted 9 July 2009
National Library of Australia, Catalogue of works by Samuel Wesley, Extracted 9 July 2009
Henry D. Rack, ‘Wesley, Samuel the younger(1690/91–1739)’, Oxford Dictionary of National Biography, Oxford University Press, 2004 accessed 15 Dec 2006
 

Heads of Blundell's School
Samuel 2
1691 births
1739 deaths
Alumni of Christ Church, Oxford
18th-century English Anglican priests
People educated at Westminster School, London
English male poets
17th-century Anglican theologians
18th-century Anglican theologians